Pierre Ochs (born  in Castres) is a French freestyle skier, specializing in  moguls.

Ochs competed at the 2006 and   2010 Winter Olympics for France. His best finish was in 2010, where he qualified for the moguls final, and ended up 12th. In 2006, he also qualified for the final, ending up 17th.

As of February 2013, his best showing at the World Championships came in 2007, where he finished 4th in the moguls event, missing out on a podium spot by less than a tenth of a point.

Ochs made his World Cup debut in January 2002. As of February 2013, he has won two World Cup medals, both bronze, with his first at La Plagne in 2008/09. His best World Cup overall finish is 8th, in 2006/07.

World Cup Podiums

References

1984 births
Living people
People from Castres
Olympic freestyle skiers of France
Freestyle skiers at the 2006 Winter Olympics
Freestyle skiers at the 2010 Winter Olympics
French male freestyle skiers
Sportspeople from Tarn (department)